Wallaroo is a defunct electoral district that elected members to the House of Assembly, the lower house of the bicameral legislature of the Australian state of South Australia. It was established in 1875 and abolished in 1970.

Successful 1891 Wallaroo by-election candidate Richard Hooper was the first Labor member of the House of Assembly, but was not a member of the newly formed United Labor Party (ULP), instead serving as an Independent Labor member. The 1892 East Adelaide by-election saw ULP candidate John McPherson win the seat. It was the first time the ULP had won a seat in the House of Assembly, with electoral success to be followed at the 1893 colonial election, winning 10 of 54 seats and the balance of power, allowing the ULP to support the liberal opposition led by Charles Kingston in defeating the conservative government led by John Downer.

The town of Wallaroo is currently located in the safe Liberal seat of Goyder. The two current Wallaroo booths totaling 3,000 voters are both marginally Liberal.

Members

Election results

References

External links
The 13 electorates from 1902 to 1915: The Adelaide Chronicle

Former electoral districts of South Australia
1875 establishments in Australia
1970 disestablishments in Australia